Gooik is a municipality located in the Belgian province of Flemish Brabant. The municipality comprises the towns of Gooik proper, Kester, Leerbeek, Strijland and Oetingen. It is also situated in the Pajottenland. On January 1, 2018 Gooik had a total population of 9,236.

References

External links
 
Official website - Available only in Dutch

Municipalities of Flemish Brabant